Harriet French Turner ( – ) was an American folk artist.

They moved to Roanoke, Virginia in 1900, where she attended the Roanoke Academy of Music and graduated from Roanoke High School in 1907. She taught at Gilmer Elementary School for two years until she married druggist James R. Turner. They had three daughters.

She began painting at age 68, later drawing comparisons to Grandma Moses.  Inspired by the scenery of the Blue Ridge Mountains area, she painted mostly landscapes.  The first painting she exhibited was purchased for the collection of Hollins College, and her immediately drew widespread attention.  She was the first living artist to be featured in a one-person show at the Abby Aldrich Rockefeller Folk Art Museum, which created a 17 minute documentary about her called Folk Artist of the Blue Ridge.   Her admirers included First Lady Lady Bird Johnson, who requested Turner's painting of the Peaks of Otter.  Turner's artistic career lasted 13 years and she created 95 paintings.

Harriet French Turner died on December 7, 1967 in Roanoke.

References 

Created via preloaddraft
American women painters
1967 deaths
Folk artists
People from Roanoke, Virginia
People from Giles County, Virginia
Painters from Virginia
20th-century American painters
20th-century American women artists